Frederick Dornhorst, KC was a Ceylonese (Sri Lankan) barrister and King's Advocate.

Educated at Colombo Academy (now Royal College Colombo), Dornhorst became a teacher at the Colombo Academy before moving on to a legal career and becoming a barrister at the Inner Temple. In 1903 he was sworn in as a King's Counsel with Ponnambalam Ramanathan and Thomas De Sampayo, the first "silks" of the Bar of Ceylon.

The Dornhorst Memorial Prize is awarded annually to the most popular student at Royal College Colombo in the memory of Frederick Dornhorst.

References
Journal of the Dutch Burger Union
Sri Lanka Burgher Family Genealogy - BROHIER Family
COUNCIL OF LEGAL EDUCATION

Alumni of Royal College, Colombo
Burgher lawyers
Ceylonese Queen's Counsel
Sri Lankan barristers
Members of the Inner Temple
20th-century King's Counsel
Sri Lankan Christians
Year of death missing
Year of birth missing